Calophyllum savannarum is a species of flowering plant in the Calophyllaceae family. It is found only in West Papua in Indonesia.

References

savannarum
Vulnerable plants
Flora of Western New Guinea
Taxonomy articles created by Polbot